Environment and Ecology Bureau (EEB) is one of the fifteen policy bureaux of the Government of Hong Kong. The agency was established on 1 July 2022. The current (since 1 July 2022) Secretary for Environment and Ecology is Tse Chin-wan.

This bureau was newly established under the re-organisation of policy bureaux proposed by Carrie Lam, the fifth Chief Executive of Hong Kong, and was adopted by John Lee, the succeeding Chief Executive after Carrie Lam. On 19 June 2022, the State Council of China announced the appointment of Tse Chin-wan, previously the Under Secretary for Environment, as the first Secretary for Environment and Ecology.

As an expanded bureau compared to the previous Environment Bureau, the bureau is in charge of portfolios such as environmental protection, conservation of natural ecology, environmental hygiene, food safety, agriculture, fisheries and animal welfare. With the reassignment of the Hong Kong Observatory to the bureau, policies on climate change and meteorology are also under its purview.

Subordinate departments 
There are two branches managed by the bureau, with several departments under each branch:Environment Branch
Environmental Protection Department
Hong Kong Observatory

Food Branch
Agriculture, Fisheries and Conservation Department
Food and Environmental Hygiene Department
Government Laboratory

Related agencies

Centre for Food Safety 
Centre for Food Safety is the food safety authority under the Food and Health Department. Established in 2006, it replaced the role formerly under Food and Environmental Hygiene Department (created 1999) and Urban Services Department (pre 1999).

References

External links

Hong Kong government policy bureaux